Reverend Amos Hubert Carnegie was a Jamaican-American Baptist minister who traveled throughout the eastern United States in the early and middle 20th century, founding and financing schools and hospitals for Black people during the Jim Crow era.  He was also the founder and director of the National Hospital Foundation, Inc.  The intellectual influence of Rev. Carnegie and the hospital movement are cited in the text and bibliography of "The Papers of Martin Luther King, Jr : Advocate of the social gospel".

Rev. Carnegie's autobiography, entitled, Faith Moves Mountains, can be read for free online.

Birth
Amos H. Carnegie, Sr.  was born on a farm in the Alison district, Manchester Parish, Jamaica, British West Indies in 1886, says Jamaica's The Gleaner, newspaper. He had eight siblings, including four boys and four girls, but one died in infancy. He was raised on a farm  by his Christian parents, Thomas and Mary (née Donaldson) Carnegie.

Early adulthood
When he had attained almost the equivalent of high school training, he joined the Police Force as a recruit, where he was appointed to the position of office orderly.  Six months later, he became a policeman in Port Antonio, Jamaica, and then was promoted to a desk job as a processing clerk.  Within three years, his eyesight became impaired and he needed to wear glasses, which police officers were not allowed to do, so he was honorably discharged from the Police Force.  Thereafter, he was appointed to a position as clerk of Port Antonio's government market.

First leadership positions
While he was a police officer in Port Antonio, he joined a Baptist church, was baptized, and became a full member of the church, where he was elected Superintendent of the Sunday School and President of the Christian Endeavor Society.  He was elected vice president of an organizing committee that founded the YMCA of Port Antonio, Jamaica, during which period he made his first public address and first accepted his to become a minister and preach Christian gospel.

Rev. Carnegie goes to Canada
In 1915, Carnegie left Jamaica for Canada, heading to the United States to study divinity.  In Canada, he sought to work his way through divinity school, but he was surprised at the prejudice, color-aroused antagonism and discrimination that he encountered in the Toronto labor market.  In spite of references from the YMCA and Jamaican Government, he could find no other than menial labor to do, picking apples, although he had served as a police officer and public administrator.

After six months pressing apples in a factory, he found a position as a sleeping car porter with the Canadian Pacific Railway Company. He was not able to earn sufficient monies to study, but with a gift from a benefactor, he enrolled in a primarily African-American school, Virginia Union University.

Carnegie imprisoned for refusing to serve in Canadian army

In 1917, Carnegie was ordered drafted into the Canadian Army, but as a Christian minister he was “hostile to the spirit of war”. For refusing to serve, he was court-martialed and sent to a prison camp where he was made to do hard labor. There, he evangelized his fellow prisoners.

Color-aroused discrimination in the United States

He arrived in a United States South that was deeply divided along racial lines by Jim Crow segregation, where other Blacks warned him to step off the sidewalks if he saw whites coming along.  However, not having grown up with segregation in his native Jamaica, Carnegie nonetheless felt uninhibited going among whites with confidence and assurance.

Marriage and children
Once in the United States, he married Susan Blake, also from Jamaica, and they had six children, one of whom died at birth.

Christian organizing

Mr. Carnegie spoke and delivered sermons at various churches and civic gatherings in Virginia, West Virginia and South Carolina. He visited jails and slums, bringing the Christian gospel to prisoners and the poor.  He became pastor of the Carmel Methodist Church.  In assessing his new surroundings, he observed that Blacks’ schools were severely dilapidated or nonexistent, while many Blacks lived on whites’ property in mud huts.  In response, Rev. Carnegie founded the first high school in Smyth County, Virginia for African American students, which was named after him:  the Carnegie High School.  It was the only Black high school in a hundred-mile area.  Alumni of the school remember Carnegie’s leadership with fondness and admiration.

Building the first schools

Two decades later, this first local Black public high school, built by Black men donating their labor, was closed in a consolidation with white public schools, with the goal of desegregation.  After the school was closed, the building housed the local Head Start program.

Rev. Carnegie was involved in dozens of projects, many financed by the Rosenwald Fund, to fund and build schools for Blacks in the American South during the Jim Crow era.

Religious formation

For lack of financial support, Carnegie struggled for several years to finish college, but he raised money by preaching at churches in the United States, and Canada, and received many donations.  He attended the Chatham Collegiate in Chatham, Ontario for a year while serving as pastor of a nearby church.

College graduation
When he graduated from Lincoln University, he won the college's singular $50.00 Nassau Prize upon graduation in 1923.  The same college journal that announced the award carried an article addressing social currents in Black America that would come to guide Carnegie's career in the ministry.  Living conditions, including abysmal housing and miserable or nonexistent education during the American Jim Crow South, were leading Blacks to engage in the great migration northward literally by the millions.

Carnegie received religious formation at a college that underscored, "The example of Lincoln Alumni, who are prominent leaders of their race in all parts of the country and in various lines of activity, holds out before the undergraduate high ideals of achievement and of usefulness in service."

Carnegie campaigns for black schools and hospitals

Returning to the United States, Rev. Carnegie traveled widely, from Florida to New England, speaking to audiences composed of civil leaders, business leaders, landowners, and politicians, and convinced southern whites to support the founding of schools for Blacks.  Among other arguments, he appealed to whites’ self-interest, arguing that the mass migration of Blacks to the North was driven by poverty and lack of education.  Proposing to build schools and hospitals for Blacks was inherently controversial  states where it had recently been illegal to assemble Blacks to teach them to read.

He argued that whites needed Black labor but would have to provide Blacks with education in order to dissuade them from leaving for the North, where more opportunity was available.  Carnegie enlisted whites in the Black schools effort even when, as a matter of principle, they did not believe in educating Blacks at all. Carnegie, however, saw the construction of as many schools as possible as a way of preparing unlettered Blacks to read the Bible and, therefore, as a natural outgrowth of his itinerant Christian ministry.

Carnegie finds funds for building black schools

With monies from the Rosenwald Fund, he built several Rosenwald schools. “A Rosenwald School was the name informally applied to over five thousand schools, shops, and teachers' homes in the United States which were built primarily for the education of African-Americans in the early 20th century . . . Julius Rosenwald, an American clothier who became part-owner and president of Sears, Roebuck and Company, was the founder of The Rosenwald Fund, through which he contributed seed money for many of the schools and other philanthropic causes. To promote collaboration between white and black citizens, Rosenwald required communities to commit public funds to the schools, as well as to contribute additional cash donations.”
 
Rev. Carnegie was one of many leaders in African-American rural communities across the South who raised millions of dollars to fund better education for their children.  His talent included locating and winning state funds available for the construction of schools for Blacks and contributions from wealthy individuals, white and black.  While raising money for others, he was often broke himself, investing his money in his school and hospital projects and eating cheese and crackers for lunch rather than accept gifts from parishioners, lest they suspect he was working for his own benefit rather than for theirs.  Meanwhile, he traveled throughout the eastern United States preaching and seeking funding for his schools.

Carnegie beaten for refusing to sit at back of Greyhound bus
Carnegie was unafraid to travel about advocating for Blacks even when he was informed that whites were unhappy with his efforts, but he was not immune to the violence that surrounded him.  "In the United States, too, Jamaicans like the Rev. Amos Carnegie had suffered from the vicious hatred of southern racists who beat him because he refused to take a back seat on a bus travelling through Georgia one night.  And there were many others like him."  The 1950s incident and the Reverend's legal action were reported widely in the United States by wire services and in the large Jamaican newspaper, The Gleaner, as well.  A photograph of him bleeding after the beating can be found in the archives of National Historic Images.

Carnegie attracts national Attention to segregation of buses

The New York Times also reported the Jim Crow beating of Mr. Carnegie for his refusal to sit in the back of a bus.  The National Black Jet magazine reported that Carnegie sued Greyhound Bus for $100,000 after the color-aroused beating.

Carnegie conceives plan to build hospitals for blacks in segregated states

Hospitals, like schools, were segregated in the United States, with Black hospitals nonexistent and white ones refusing to see or treat Blacks.  Seeing a generalized need for hospitals for Blacks, Rev. Carnegie conceived a plan for Blacks to build hospitals staffed by Black doctors, through the National Hospital Foundation, particularly in cities with Black populations of at least 10,000.  But, his efforts were often met with criticism and controversy.

Controversy

In 1937, the journal of the National Medical Association published a discussion of Rev. Carnegie's hospital movement, reporting that he was endeavoring to raise a penny from each African American in the United States, but alleging that he had appropriated the name of the Association without authorization in discussions with the New York Times and rejecting the Reverend's attempts to attain the support of the Association.

In the article, the Association rebuked and rebuffed the Reverend, ridiculing his belief that he could collect money from all African Americans nationwide and calling his proposals "dreams".  However, as Vanessa Northington Gamble demonstrates in the historical text Making a Place for Ourselves: The Black Hospital Movement 1920-1945, because whites denied Blacks access to the hospitals where whites were treated, the question of whether and how to begin to provide hospital care to Blacks was inherently political and controversial. Rev. Carnegie's voice was influential in the debate; his article entitled, But Integration is Empty Talk was widely cited and debated at the time.

The book, The History of Healthcare in Lynchburg, published in Virginia alleges in a section entitled, "And One Villain: The Rev. Amos Carnegie", that in early December, 1935, the Rev. Amos Carnegie appeared in Lynchburg, collected money from local Blacks with a promise to build a hospital staffed by Black doctors, and then disappeared with the money and without such a hospital being built. However, the locally produced and self-published book includes no sources or citations whatever for the potentially baseless accusation.

The mere accusation highlights the difficulty the Reverend faced engaging in fundraising and earning the trust of color aroused Black and white populations. In one fundraising campaign, he proposed that money would be raised among Blacks to be held in trust by white trustees.

Rev. Carnegie arrested

He was arrested in Birmingham, AL and convicted of soliciting monies without a license, given a suspended sentence of a year in jail and fined $50.00.  When he traveled, he continued to face segregated churches, transportation, hotels, restaurants and other facilities.  His children attended segregated schools and rarely saw whites at all, said his daughter in her autobiography.

Rev. Carnegie's projects capture the nation's imagination

In 1951, the Journal of Medical Education reported that Rev. Carnegie's National Hospital Foundation and Howard University jointly proposed a 200-bed "interracial" hospital for Washington, DC "predicated on obtaining a $2,000,000 grant from Congress to be matched by the contributions of Negroes throughout the country.  Rev. Carnegie said the hospital would be interracial in the sense that both Negro and white physicians would be on its staff and that it would accept patients of all races, but that its primary function would be to serve a community of 800,000 Negroes in the northeast sector of Washington who are not now provided with adequate health facilities."

Carnegie proposes $4,000,000 for New York blacks

He also proposed a 200-bed hospital for New York City that was to cost $4,000,000 reported the New York Times.  But, he experienced at least one set back when only 100 Blacks appeared for a finance rally in support of the efforts.

National magazines report Carnegie's efforts

On October 1, 1953, Jet magazine reported that, "plans for a 200-bed Birmingham [AL] hospital, staffed by Negro doctors and nurses, were outlined to a group of white citizens by the Rev. Amos H. Carnegie, president of the National Hospital Foundation, Inc.  Reverend Carnegie asked Negro employees to contribute fifty cents a week for twenty weeks to finance construction of the hospital.  White trustees would control the money raised, Carnegie said."

Carnegie develops novel fundraising models

Carnegie's fundraising model varied depending upon the audience and the circumstances, always involving such grants, state and federal monies were available and sometimes proposing that Blacks donate a penny per week toward the construction of hospitals.

Carnegie’s international influence grows international

Indefatigable, the Rev. Carnegie was an inveterate letter writer to institutions, civic leaders and celebrities, with letters published in the New York Times, the Washington Post more than once, a collection of letters to Marion Anderson, and in the archives of Washington, DC's National Negro Opera Company.  Rev. Carnegie wrote an article about desegregation that was cited widely by Blacks thinkers and organizers.  He was cited various times in the national Black Jet magazine for his hospital plans, for being beaten while protesting Jim Crow bus segregation, when he refused to sit at the back of a bus, and for his arrest for fundraising in Birmingham, AL without a license.

Carnegie takes his campaign to the radio

Many newspapers' published schedules of radio programs in the 1940s and 50s included reports that the Rev. Carnegie would be speaking on issues of importance to Black people.

Carnegie a returning hero in Jamaica

In June 1950, Carnegie returned to Jamaica for the first time in almost four decades, as an ambassador for his United States hospital movement.  The Kingston Gleaner newspaper of Jamaica reported with respect to the National Hospital Foundation, "At the head of this organization is its founder and director, the Rev. Amos H. Carnegie. Mr. Carnegie, paying his first visit to the homeland since he left it, visited the Gleaner yesterday and in a brief talk told of the success that the nationwide hospital scheme that he is directing..."

Family life

The Rev. Carnegie and his wife Susan had six children, including the Hon. Amos Hubert Carnegie, Jr., a New York state judge  ; the late Rachel Virginia (Holland), Ph.D., professor of sociology  ; the late Leanora M. (Leach), Ph.D., high school teacher  ;   the late Vida Mae (Gaynor), Ph.D., clinical psychologist and author and the late Joseph Carnegie, a New York labor organizer, as well as "Baby Carnegie" who was still born.

In her autobiography, the late Vida Mae Carnegie (Gaynor), first-born daughter of the Rev. Carnegie, says that the reverend was often away from the home, failed to provide sustenance or appear for special events in her life, and made a "narcissistic" promise to fund her education on which he subsequently reneged, causing her to lose another scholarship that she would otherwise have received.

The Reverend's late daughter angrily charges in her autobiography that her father should not have referred to himself as a "Reverend", since he did not pastor a church after 1933, according to her.  However, the criticism is misplaced.  For example, the Rev. Dr. Martin Luther King, Jr. used the appellation "Reverend" throughout the Civil Rights Movement although he did not actively pastor an individual church during that period.

The Rev. Carnegie's autobiography and that of his oldest daughter both recount that Rev. Carnegie did not always or often have a paid position as a pastor; was an itinerant organizer who subsisted financially from gifts from friends and supporters; often did not have money that he could use to support his family; and could not possibly have been present much in the home during those times when he was meeting civic leaders, politicians, clergy and the Black and white public for the purpose of organizing the construction of schools and hospitals.  It is likely that his family suffered considerably even as the public profited from his civic activities.

Rev. Carnegie's autobiography reviewed in New York Times

In 1950, Rev. Carnegie published his autobiography, entitled, Faith Moves Mountains, which is available for free online.

The New York Times twice announced the publication of the Reverend's autobiography, in April and June 1950.

In The Reverend's autobiography, he does not provide the names of his parents or those of any of his siblings and only names one of his children - the oldest.

His autobiography did not identify his parents or siblings by name.  He does not mention that he is married and has children until a point in his autobiography that is long after his actual marriage and the birth of his children would have taken place.

Rev. Carnegie's autobiography provides no details of his courtship, his wife's profession or the circumstances of their wedding.  In fact, when the Negro Yearbook: a review of the events affecting Negro Life, reviewed the Reverend's autobiography in 1952, they observed that: 
 The Reverend Mr. Carnegie has lived a most interesting life, but he lacks the ability to record it to best advantage. His main difficulty is a tendency to overlook all autobiographical details except religious ones. For example, he spent one full year at Virginia Union University, and all that he records of this experience is that he "converted" his roommate.  The author has labeled this work "Volume I."  Presumably other volumes are to follow. Since he has lived so fully, one hopes that Mr.  Carnegie in subsequent installments will give a picture of his whole life, not just those episodes connected with moral and religious uplift.

When the Reverend's autobiography does mention his wife, he recounts only the disagreements they had over their lack of money. He quotes a discussion in which she asks him, surprised, how he managed to purchase food. He reports, word for word, that he responds to her in a manner that can only be described as sarcastic and dismissive.  The Reverend reported that this type of conversation was typical. He expressed no regret.

Although his five children experienced material deprivations in their childhoods, they were all successful adults.  His late offspring included a judge;  a college professor a grade school teacher; a clinical psychologist-author- educator and a union organizer.

Rev. Carnegie dies

The Rev. Amos H. Carnegie died in August, 1978 in Flushing, Queens, New York.

References

1886 births
1978 deaths
Jamaican emigrants to the United States
Jamaican Baptist ministers
Lincoln University (Missouri) alumni
20th-century Baptist ministers from the United States